Karlheinz Pflipsen (born 31 October 1970) is a German former professional footballer who played as a midfielder.

Club career
A playmaker, Pflipsen played the first decade of his career at hometown club Borussia Mönchengladbach, alongside stars like Martin Dahlin and Stefan Effenberg, winning the German Cup in 1995. In 1992–93, he netted a career-best ten Bundesliga goals (squad's best with Dahlin).

After Borussia's relegation in 1998–99, Pflipsen was signed by Greek club Panathinaikos, and his talent became evident from the very beginning. In a 1999–2000 UEFA Cup match against Deportivo de La Coruña, Pflipsen sustained a cruciate ligament injury in his left knee (he had already suffered the same injury on his right) and missed most of his first season. After recovering, he returned to Germany to play for Alemannia Aachen and TSV 1860 Munich, both in the second division, and retired at almost 35.

In 2008, Pflipsen started his managerial career, joining Rot-Weiß Essen II.

International career
Pflipsen collected one cap for Germany, on 13 June 1993 against USA, a match in the 1993 U.S. Cup that Germany won 4–3. He came on as a substitute for Jürgen Klinsmann, wearing the number 13.

Honours
Borussia Mönchengladbach
 DFB-Pokal: 1994–95; runner-up 1991–92

Alemannia Aachen
 DFB-Pokal: runner-up 2003–04

References

External links
 
 
 

1970 births
Living people
Sportspeople from Mönchengladbach
Footballers from North Rhine-Westphalia
German footballers
Association football midfielders
Germany international footballers
Germany under-21 international footballers
Bundesliga players
2. Bundesliga players
Super League Greece players
Borussia Mönchengladbach players
Alemannia Aachen players
TSV 1860 Munich players
Panathinaikos F.C. players
German expatriate footballers
German expatriate sportspeople in Greece
Expatriate footballers in Greece
West German footballers